There are several engineering entrance examinations in India:

 Engineering Agricultural and Medical Common Entrance Test
 Joint Entrance Examination (JEE)
 Kerala Engineering Agricultural Medical 
 Graduate Aptitude Test in Engineering (GATE)
 Odisha Joint Entrance Examination
 Rajasthan Pre-Engineering Test (RPET) / Rajasthan Engineering Admission Process (REAP)
 Birla Institute of Technology and Science Admission Test
 Tamil Nadu Engineering Admission
 WBJEE
 Consortium of Medical, Engineering and Dental Colleges of Karnataka(COMED-K)
 Gujarat Common Entrance Test (GUJCET)
 Karnataka Common Entrance Test (KCET)
 Goa Common Entrance Test (GCET)
Deemed Universities conduct their own entrances like VITEEE by VIT, AEEE by Amrita Schools of Engineering, MET by Manipal,etc.

Besides these exams, there is also a proposal for Common engineering entrance examination.

References

Engineering Entrance Exams
Engineering Entrance Exams